CP2K is a freely available (GPL) quantum chemistry and solid state physics program package, written in Fortran 2008, to perform atomistic simulations of solid state, liquid, molecular, periodic, material, crystal, and biological systems. It provides a general framework for different methods: density functional theory (DFT) using a mixed Gaussian and plane waves approach (GPW) via LDA, GGA, MP2, or RPA levels of theory, classical pair and many-body potentials, semi-empirical (AM1, PM3, MNDO, MNDOd, PM6) and tight-binding Hamiltonians, as well as Quantum Mechanics/Molecular Mechanics (QM/MM) hybrid schemes relying on the Gaussian Expansion of the Electrostatic Potential (GEEP). The Gaussian and Augmented Plane Waves method (GAPW) as an extension of the GPW method allows for all-electron calculations. CP2K can do simulations of molecular dynamics, metadynamics, Monte Carlo, Ehrenfest dynamics, vibrational analysis, core level spectroscopy, energy minimization, and transition state optimization using NEB or dimer method.

CP2K provides editor plugins for Vim and Emacs syntax highlighting, along with other tools for input generation and output processing.

The latest version 2023.1 was released on 1 January 2023.

See also 
Car–Parrinello molecular dynamics
Computational chemistry
Molecular dynamics
Monte Carlo algorithm
Energy minimization
Quantum chemistry
Quantum chemistry computer programs
Ab initio quantum chemistry methods
Møller–Plesset perturbation theory
Hartree–Fock method
Random phase approximation
Density functional theory
Harris functional
Tight binding
Semi-empirical quantum chemistry method

Key Papers

External links 
 Official CP2K Website
 Users' Forum
 1st CP2K Tutorial: Enabling the power of imagination in MD Simulations
 2nd CP2K Tutorial: Enabling the power of imagination in MD Simulations
 CP2K User Tutorial: "Computational Spectroscopy"
 Ascalaph, a 3rd party graphical shell for CP2K and other quantum chemistry software

References 

Density functional theory software
Computational chemistry software
Molecular dynamics software
Monte Carlo software
Molecular modelling software
Monte Carlo molecular modelling software
Monte Carlo particle physics software
Chemistry software for Linux
Free chemistry software
Free physics software
Physics software
Scientific simulation software
Simulation software
Free science software
Science software for Linux
Science software
Free software programmed in Fortran